Mel can be the abbreviated version of the given names Melvyn, Melvin, Melfyn, Melanie, Melika, Melhem, Melina, Melinda, Melody, Melissa, Melita /Melitta, Melchior, Melindro or Melville. It is also a standalone name from the Gaelic Maol, meaning bald; this was used to refer to tonsured men to mean servant, as in "Maol-Iosa" - Servant of Jesus.

People
People with this name include:

Mel Allen (1913–1996), American sportscaster
Mel B (born 1975), English singer, former member of the Spice Girls
Mel Blanc (1908–1989), American voice actor
Mel Bleeker (1920–1996), American National Football League player
Mel Brooks (born 1926), American comedy filmmaker, writer and actor
Mel C (born 1974), English singer, former member of the Spice Girls
Mel Carter (born 1939), American soul and pop singer
Mel Corry (1964-2021), Irish Communist, Trade Unionist and Bluegrass musician
Mel Gibson (born 1956), Australian/American film actor and director
Mel Giedroyc (born 1968), British TV presenter and comedian
Mel Gray (disambiguation), several people
Mel Harris (born 1956), American actress
Mel Jones (born 1972), Australian cricketer
Mel Kaye, subject of The Story of Mel, about the archetypal "real programmer"
Mel Lastman (1933–2021), Canadian businessman and politician
Mel Lisboa (born 1982), Brazilian actress
Mel Martin (born 1947), British actress
Mel McDaniel (1942–2011), American country music singer-songwriter
Mel Ott (1909–1958), American baseball player
Mel Peachey (born 1980), British television host
Mel Rosen (1928–2018), American track coach
Mel Smith (1952-2013), British actor, writer and director
Mel Street (1933–1978), American country music singer
Mel Stuessy (1901–1980), American football player
Mel Tiangco (born 1955), Filipino journalist, host, news caster
Mel Tillis (1932–2017), American country music singer-songwriter
Mel Tormé (1925–1999), American jazz singer, composer, arranger, and drummer
Mel Whinnen (born 1942), former Australian rules footballer
Mel White (born 1940), American clergyman and author
Saint Mel (died 488), early Irish missionary and founder of the diocese of Ardagh
Mel Robbins (born 1968), American podcast host, author, and motivational speaker

Fictional characters
 Mel Burton, a character on the soap opera Hollyoaks
 Mel Bush, the companion character for the Sixth and Seventh Doctor in the Doctor Who television series
 Mel Karnofsky, a character from the television sitcom Frasier
 Mel Owen, a character on the soap opera Eastenders
 Mel Sharples, owner and cook of Mel's Diner on the American sitcom Alice
 Mel, a Welsh terrier in the direct-to-video animated film Balto III: Wings of Change
 Mel Vera, one of the main characters of the 2018 television series Charmed
 Sideshow Mel, a character on the cartoon show The Simpsons
 Mel, the title character of the video game Portal Stories: Mel
 Mel, a pug in the computer-animated film The Secret Life of Pets
 Cousin Mel, the antagonist of Grandma Got Run Over by a Reindeer
 "Mel" Melathia, a character in the Filipino Webtoon series Mage & Demon Queen
 Mel, a character in the video game The Last of Us Part II
 Mel Medarda, one of the main characters in the 2021 animated series Arcane: League of Legends
Mel, the leader in minions

See also 
 Mell, Japanese singer

English-language masculine given names
English-language feminine given names
English-language unisex given names
Feminine given names
Masculine given names
Unisex given names
Hypocorisms
English unisex given names
English masculine given names
English feminine given names